Whiteleggiidae is a family of crustaceans belonging to the order Tanaidacea.

Genera:
 Pseudowhiteleggia Lang, 1970
 Whiteleggia Lang, 1970

References

Tanaidacea